INS Subhadra (P51) is a Sukanya class patrol vessel of the Indian Navy.

INS Subhadra has been used as a test bed for the Dhanush ship-launched ballistic missile and associated stabilization and launch platform.

References

Sukanya-class patrol vessels
Patrol vessels of the Indian Navy
Naval ships of India